Epica or EPICA may refer to:
 Epica (band), a Dutch symphonic metal band
 Epica (Kamelot album), 2003
 Epica (Audiomachine album), 2012
 The European Project for Ice Coring in Antarctica (EPICA)
 The Epica Awards (International Advertising Awards)
 Daewoo Tosca, also known as Chevrolet Epica or Holden Epica
 Daewoo Magnus, also known as Chevrolet Epica
 Banksia epica, a South Australian native bush

See also
Epic (disambiguation)